Tony Leung Chiu-wai (born 27 June 1962) is a Hong Kong actor and singer. He is one of Asia's most successful and internationally recognized actors, and was named as "Small Tiger" among the Five Tiger Generals of TVB. He has won many international acting prizes, including the Cannes Film Festival award for Best Actor for his performance in Wong Kar-wai's film In the Mood for Love. He was named by CNN as one of "Asia's 25 Greatest Actors of All Time."

Leung is known for his collaborations with director Wong Kar-wai, with whom he has worked in seven films, including Chungking Express (1994), Happy Together (1997), In the Mood for Love (2000), 2046 (2004), and The Grandmaster (2013). He also appeared in three Venice Film Festival Golden Lion-winning films: A City of Sadness (1989), Cyclo (1995) and Lust, Caution (2007), directed by Ang Lee. Leung also stars in the Academy Award-nominated film Hero (2002), the cult classic Hard Boiled (1992), and box office hits Infernal Affairs (2002) and Red Cliff (2008). He later came to prominence in Hollywood with his role as Xu Wenwu in the Marvel Cinematic Universe film Shang-Chi and the Legend of the Ten Rings (2021).

Leung has a comprehensive set of awards that he has won in a career that began in the 1980s. For In the Mood for Love, Leung earned the Best Actor award at the Cannes Film Festival. He is also a seven-time winner at the Hong Kong Film Awards and three-time winner at the Golden Horse Film Awards, holding the record for most awards in the Best Actor category. The 2002 book East Asian Film Stars describes Leung as "undoubtedly one of the most successful and widely-acclaimed Hong Kong actors of his generation, with a broad and diverse filmography."

Early life
Leung was born in Hong Kong to a family of Taishan, Guangdong ancestry. Leung's early childhood was punctuated with parents' quarrels and arguments about money. A mischievous boy in his early years, Leung's personality changed when his father, a chronic gambler, left the family when he was eight; he and his younger sister were brought up by their mother.

Leung was a slightly reticent, quiet child. He has said that his childhood experiences paved the way for his acting career, which allows him to openly express his feelings:You don't know what happened, just one day your pop disappears. And from that day on I try not to communicate with anyone. I'm so afraid to talk to my classmates, afraid that if someone says something about family I won't know what to do. So I became very isolated. So that's why I love acting, because I can express all my feelings the way I couldn't for so long.

I'm a quiet person. And then when I went to TV it all came out; I cried and I wasn't ashamed. The audience thinks it's the character's feelings, but really it's my feelings, all coming out in a rush.Leung went to private school, but he quit at the age of 15 due to financial difficulties. He was a well-behaved teenager who was very close to his mother. During an interview on the making of Hero, he says that he sees his mother as his definition of a hero for having brought up two children alone.

Television career
 
After quitting his studies, Leung worked in a variety of jobs, first as a grocer's runner at his uncle's shop, then a home appliance salesman in a Hong Kong shopping centre. Around the age of 16 he met future actor and comedian Stephen Chow who influenced his decision to become an actor and remains a good friend.

In 1982, he graduated from television channel TVB's acting class. Due to his boyish looks, TVB initially cast him as the host of a children's programme 430 Space Shuttle, but soon moved him to drama roles beginning with Soldier of Fortune (1982). He was quickly promoted to leading man status in highly successful primetime series including The Duke of Mount Deer (1984) and New Heavenly Sword and Dragon Sabre (1986). Leung mostly enjoyed comedies during his television years; it was for these he became well known. In the 1980s, he was named as one of "TVB's Five Tigers" (their five up-and-coming male TV stars) along with Andy Lau, Felix Wong, Michael Miu and Kent Tong.

Leung starred in the extremely popular Police Cadet TV serial in 1984 (later named Police Cadet 84 to distinguish it from its two subsequent sequels). The series had an average viewership rating of 50% per episode during its original run. Leung played an outgoing young man who decides to become a police officer; Maggie Cheung, who also started her career at the same time, played Leung's upstairs neighbour and love interest. Since then they have worked together on The Yang's Saga (1985), Days of Being Wild (1991), The Eagle Shooting Heroes (1993), Ashes of Time (1994), In the Mood for Love (2000), Hero (2002), and 2046 (2005). Interviewed by Wong Kar-wai, Leung said that he considered Cheung to be his alter ego. "Maggie is a truly formidable partner – one to waltz with. We do not spend a lot of time with each other, as we like to keep some mystery between us. Whenever I see her, I discover something new about her".

After 8 years with TVB, he left the network to focus on his film career with his final television drama being Ode to Gallantry in 1989.

Film career

Leung is considered by many to be the most acclaimed contemporary actor in greater China. He first garnered international attention in Hou Hsiao-hsien's 1989 film A City of Sadness, which won the Venice Golden Lion. Before that he was already locally known for his TV shows and films in the mid 1980s in Hong Kong.

Leung's initial transition from television to film in the late 80s and early 90s is considered a low period in his career. He had won two HKFA Best Supporting Actor awards in quick succession but was struggling to establish himself as a leading man on the big screen. In 1992, when he was nominated for a third time in the Supporting Actor category for Hard Boiled, Leung refused the nomination on the grounds that he had a leading role in the film. His protest was supported by director John Woo and co-star Chow Yun-fat. This later led the Hong Kong Film Awards to change its nomination rules to allow for multiple leading roles from the same film. Leung has also stated that prior to Days of Being Wild (1990), he had lost interest in acting and even considered quitting, but working with Wong Kar-wai and seeing his scene in the final film changed his mind. His career entered a new chapter when he won dual Best Actor awards at the Golden Horse Awards and Hong Kong Film Awards for Chungking Express (1994), becoming only the second actor to do so after Danny Lee in 1984. He later repeated the feat with Infernal Affairs in 2003. Beginning with Chungking Express and over the next thirteen years, Leung picked up a record of eight Best Actor wins at the two most prestigious Chinese language film awards, plus a Best Actor prize at Cannes.

Leung often collaborates with director Wong Kar-wai and has appeared in many of his films. His roles include the lonely policeman in Chungking Express (1994), a gay Chinese expatriate living in Argentina in Happy Together (1997), and a self-controlled victim of adultery in In the Mood for Love (2000) for which he won the Best Actor award at Cannes. He reprised his role from In the Mood for Love as a new Chow Mo-wan in 2046 (2004) and trained in Wing Chun for five years to prepare for his role as Ip Man in Wong's The Grandmaster. Wong's Jet Tone Film Production was also Leung's management agency for many years until 2018.

In addition to his works with Wong, Leung has also starred in three Venice Golden Lion winning films: A City of Sadness (1989), Cyclo (1995) and Lust, Caution (2007), cementing his reputation internationally in the arthouse cinema world. In 2014, he was a member of the jury of the 64th Berlin International Film Festival, and in 2017 Leung was invited to become a member of the Academy of Motion Picture Arts and Sciences. In 2022, he was crowned the Asian Filmmaker of the Year at the 27th Busan International Film Festival. Robert De Niro and Brad Pitt are admirers of his work, and Leung has been labeled by The Times as Asia's answer to Clark Gable due to their romantic leading roles. His place in Asian cinema has also been compared to Cary Grant, or a combination of several A-list Hollywood stars.

Leung is widely believed to be a method actor. He has stated in interviews that he often has trouble separating the characters from himself, beginning with his early TV roles. He usually takes long breaks after filming to recover from a psychologically taxing role, and remnants of the characters still remain within him years later. He has said that the voice of his wife Carina Lau can bring him back to reality.

Leung admits that he has a tendency to stay in his comfort zone and work with familiar teams and filmmakers. Over the course of his career, he has worked with Wong Kar-wai eight times (including See You Tomorrow (2016) which Wong wrote), three times with John Woo, three times with Derek Yee, and twice with Hou Hsiao-hsien. He has also worked with the creators of Infernal Affairs (Andrew Lau, Alan Mak, Felix Chong) on three other films: Confession of Pain (2006), The Silent War (2012) and the upcoming Once Upon a Time in Hong Kong. In recent years, Leung has become more adventurous and more willing to try new things; this includes collaborating with new directors and taking on his first Hollywood role.

In an interview with Senses of Cinema in 2001, Leung said that he had no plans to make a Hollywood debut, but would consider it for the right project. He said, "I have many more choices on the character I can play (in Hong Kong). The role for Asian actors and actresses is very restrictive in Hollywood movies." Actors such as Chow Yun-fat and Jet Li had then made their own debuts in the 1990s. In 2005, he signed with an American agent with the intention to appear in a Hollywood film. Producer Kevin Feige announced at the 2019 San Diego Comic-Con that Leung will join the Marvel Cinematic Universe as the villain in Shang-Chi and the Legend of the Ten Rings, marking his Hollywood debut. Leung's character Wenwu is a composite character of Fu Manchu and the Mandarin. The movie was released in 2021 and his performance was universally praised.

Leung also had a successful Cantopop and Mandarin pop singing career in the 1990s, which he abandoned to focus on acting. He still occasionally sings for his films; the theme song of Infernal Affairs which he performed with Andy Lau is one of the Top 10 Song of 2003 and won the 22nd Hong Kong Film Awards' Best Original Film Song.

During the promotion of the film Hero, some commentators in Hong Kong alleged that Leung expressed the view that the Tiananmen Square demonstration crackdown was necessary to maintain stability. Leung made a single comment in response that he may have been misquoted and his statement taken out of context.

Leung speaks Cantonese, English and Mandarin. Lust, Caution (2007) is the first film where he used his own voice in a Mandarin-speaking role (his dialogue in Hero is dubbed) and Shang-chi and the Legend of the Ten Rings (2021) is his first English-speaking role, despite always being fluent in the language.

In 2021, Leung and Andy Lau completed filming the crime drama film Once Upon a Time in Hong Kong, inspired by the downfall of the Carrian Group in the 1980s. This is the duo's first collaboration since Infernal Affairs III in 2003. Felix Chong, who had previously co-written the Infernal Affairs trilogy, is the writer and director. In 2023, Leung starred in the World War II spy thriller Hidden Blade, produced by Bona Film Group.

Personal life
Leung publicly dated fellow TVB actress Margie Tsang in an on-again, off-again relationship from 1982-1988. In 1986 during one of their breakups, Leung briefly dated Kitty Lai, his co-star at the time in New Heavenly Sword and Dragon Sabre, before getting back together with Tsang. Leung and Tsang broke up permanently in 1988 and he has been in a relationship with Carina Lau since 1989.

Relationship with Carina Lau

Leung and Carina Lau are one of Hong Kong's biggest celebrity couples. They began their romantic relationship in 1989 after working together on a Hong Kong production of Run For Your Wife and dated for 19 years before marrying in Bhutan in 2008. They had known each other since The Clones in 1984, and also co-starred together in Duke of Mount Deer (1984), Police Cadet (1984, 1985, 1988), The Yangs' Saga (1985), Days of Being Wild (1991), He Ain't Heavy, He's My Father (1993), Ashes of Time (1994), and 2046 (2005).

In 1990, during the filming of Days of Being Wild, Lau was abducted for several hours. Leung dropped out of the film to spend more time with her. Wong Kar-wai said, "Originally, there were plans for Days of Being Wild I and II, and the sequence featuring Leung was meant to be the opening scene of the second movie. But two things happened, one of which was that Days of Being Wild didn't do well in Hong Kong, so the producers said, 'No Part 2.' The other reason was Lau's kidnapping."

On 21 July 2008, the couple married in Bhutan. The wedding ceremony was directed by Wong Kar-wai and attended by numerous celebrities including Faye Wong, Li Yapeng, Bridgitte Lin, Cecilia Yip, Ti Lung and Chang Chen. The event gained significant media attention in Hong Kong, with media companies spending hundreds of thousands of dollars to cover the wedding party.

According to Ming Pao Daily News, Faye Wong and Li Yapeng had taken the couple to India in 2007 to visit the 17th Karmapa. The Karmapa's counsel helped them to resolve a crisis in their relationship, and he also suggested Bhutan as a wedding venue.

Religion
Leung is a Buddhist. He has donated to constructions of Buddhist institutions, performed his marriage in a Buddhist ceremony, attends Buddhist gatherings, and had been seen doing Buddhist palm greetings. He appeared pro bono in the Bhutanese Buddhist film Hema Hema: Sing Me a Song While I Wait (2016). In 2016, he was seen at a ceremony in India that was also attended by members of the Tibetan government-in-exile, which earned the consternation of Chinese officials.

Filmography

Film

Television

Discography

Awards and nominations

International honours
:
  Officier of the National Ordre des Arts et des Lettres (2015)

References

External links

Tony Leung Chiu-wai at the Hong Kong Movie Database
Tony Leung Chiu-wai at LoveHKFilm.com
Tony Leung Chiu-wai fan site

1962 births
20th-century Hong Kong male actors
21st-century Hong Kong male actors
Living people
Cantopop singers
Hong Kong Buddhists
Hong Kong male film actors
Hong Kong male singers
Hong Kong Mandopop singers
Hong Kong male television actors
Cannes Film Festival Award for Best Actor winners
Best Actor Asian Film Award winners
Hong Kong idols
Officiers of the Ordre des Arts et des Lettres